James McKenzie (13 August 1903 – 8 January 1931) was a Scottish boxer who competed for Great Britain in the 1924 Summer Olympics in Paris.  He was the silver medalist in the flyweight division.  McKenzie was defeated in the final by American Fidel LaBarba.  LaBarba later became the professional world flyweight champion.

Olympic results
Here are James McKenzie's results from the flyweight division of the 1924 Olympic boxing tournament:

 First Round: bye
 Round of 16: defeated Leo Turksma of the Netherlands by a third-round knockout
 Quarterfinal: defeated Jock MacGregor of Canada by decision
 Semifinal: defeated Raymond Fee of the United States by decision
 Final: lost to Fidel LaBarba of the United States by decision

References

External links
James McKenzie's profile at databaseOlympics

1903 births
1931 deaths
Boxers at the 1924 Summer Olympics
Scottish male boxers
Flyweight boxers
Olympic boxers of Great Britain
Olympic silver medallists for Great Britain
Olympic medalists in boxing
Scottish Olympic medallists
People from Leith
Medalists at the 1924 Summer Olympics